Steven Cade Cavalli (born August 14, 1998) is an American professional baseball pitcher for the Washington Nationals of Major League Baseball (MLB). He was selected 22nd overall by the Nationals in the 2020 MLB draft and made his MLB debut in 2022.

Amateur career
Cavalli attended Bixby High School in Bixby, Oklahoma, where he played baseball. In 2016, his junior year, he had a 7–1 win-loss record with a 2.02 earned run average (ERA) along with a .416 batting average, four home runs and 47 runs batted in (RBIs) at the plate. He missed a majority of his senior season in 2017 due to a back injury. He was selected by the Atlanta Braves in the 29th round of the 2017 Major League Baseball draft, but did not sign and instead enrolled at the University of Oklahoma where he played college baseball.

In 2018, Cavalli's freshman year for the Oklahoma Sooners, he pitched to a 6.75 ERA over  innings while hitting .202 with six home runs and 28 RBIs over 58 games. After the 2018 season, he played collegiate summer baseball with the Wareham Gatemen of the Cape Cod Baseball League. As a sophomore in 2019, Cavalli pitched to a 5–3 record and a 3.28 ERA over 12 starts along with batting .319 with four home runs and 17 RBIs in 19 games. He missed three weeks during the season due to soreness. That summer, he played for the United States collegiate national baseball team. Cavalli entered his junior year in 2020 as a top prospect for the upcoming draft and was named the Big 12 Conference Preseason Pitcher of the Year. He made four starts in which he compiled a 4.18 ERA and 37 strikeouts over  innings before the college baseball season was cut short due to the COVID-19 pandemic.

Professional career
The Washington Nationals selected Cavalli in the first round, with the 22nd overall selection, in the 2020 Major League Baseball draft and he signed for a $3 million signing bonus. He did not play a minor league game in 2020 due to the cancellation of the minor league season caused by the pandemic. 

To begin the 2021 season, Cavalli was assigned to the Wilmington Blue Rocks of the High-A East with whom he made his professional debut. After pitching to a 3–1 record and 1.77 ERA over  innings, he was promoted to the Harrisburg Senators of the Double-A Northeast on June 14. That same month, Cavalli was selected to play in the All-Star Futures Game at Coors Field. In mid-August, after starting 11 games and going 3–3 with a 2.79 ERA and eighty strikeouts over 58 innings with Harrisburg, Cavalli was promoted to the Rochester Red Wings of the Triple-A East. Over six starts with Rochester, he went 1–5 with 7.30 ERA. His total of 175 strikeouts for the season between the three clubs led the minor leagues. He returned to Rochester to begin the 2022 season. He was selected to represent the Nationals at the 2022 All-Star Futures Game.

On August 26, 2022, the Nationals selected Cavalli's contract for him to make his MLB debut that night at Nationals Park versus the Cincinnati Reds. He pitched  innings and allowed seven runs, six hits, and two walks while striking out six and hitting three batters in a 7–3 loss. During spring training in 2023, Cavalli sprained the ulnar collateral ligament of the elbow in his pitching arm and will undergo Tommy John surgery, ending his 2023 season.

References

External links

Oklahoma Sooners bio

1998 births
Living people
Sportspeople from Tulsa, Oklahoma
Baseball players from Oklahoma
Major League Baseball pitchers
Washington Nationals players
Oklahoma Sooners baseball players
United States national baseball team players
Wareham Gatemen players
Wilmington Blue Rocks players
Harrisburg Senators players
Rochester Red Wings players